Doreswamy is an Indian family name.

 Mysore V. Doreswamy Iyengar, 1920 – 1997, a Carnatic musician,
 Harohalli Srinivasaiah Doreswamy, born in 1918, an Indian Freedom Movement activist.
 Dr Mysore Doreswamy Madhusudan, an Indian wildlife biologist and ecologist.